The State Register of Heritage Places is maintained by the Heritage Council of Western Australia. , 115 places are heritage-listed in the Shire of Gnowangerup, of which two are on the State Register of Heritage Places.

List

State Register of Heritage Places
The Western Australian State Register of Heritage Places, lists the following two state registered places within the Shire of Gnowangerup:

Shire of Gnowangerup heritage-listed places
The following places are heritage listed in the Shire of Gnowangerup but are not State registered:

References

Gnowangerup
Gnowangerup